Story: 25 Years of Hits is a compilation album released by the UK electronic music group Pet Shop Boys. It was released in March 2009, as a promotion for their forthcoming album Yes, with the UK Sunday newspaper The Mail on Sunday.

Track listing

References

External links 
 Official Pet Shop Boys website

2009 greatest hits albums
Pet Shop Boys compilation albums